The Balbina Dam is a hydroelectric dam and power station on the Uatumã River in the Amazon Rainforest, Brazil. The location is under the municipality of Presidente Figueiredo jurisdiction, in the state of Amazonas.

Structure

The Balbina Dam was built from 1985 to 1989 and is managed by Manaus Energia, under the Eletronorte system. The first of five generators began operating in February 1989.

Controversy
The dam was established to provide a renewable electricity supply to the city of Manaus but was considered by locals a controversial project from the start, due to the loss of forest and displacement of tribal homes grounds.
About  of land formerly occupied by the Waimiri-Atroari was removed from the Waimiri Atroari Indigenous Territory and flooded.
The dam was also criticized for its expensive construction and maintenance costs.
As a result of the methane released from its vast reservoir, proportional to its output, the Balbina Dam emits ten times more greenhouse gases than a coal plant.
The dam is the least efficient in Brazil in terms of the area flooded for each megawatt generated.

Conservation
The lake and island ecosystems formed by the dam are protected by the  Uatumã Biological Reserve, a strictly protected conservation unit created in 2002.
The west shore is protected by the  Caverna do Maroaga Environmental Protection Area, established in 1990.
Downstream from the dam the Uatumã runs through the  Uatumã Sustainable Development Reserve, created in 2004.
The dam regulates the river flow through the reserve, and reduces seasonal flooding.

See also 

 List of power stations in Brazil

References

Sources

Dams completed in 1989
Energy infrastructure completed in 1989
Dams in Amazonas (Brazilian state)
Hydroelectric power stations in Brazil